Hanne Eriksen (born 20 September 1960, in Copenhagen) is a Danish rower.

References 
 
 

1960 births
Living people
Danish female rowers
Rowers from Copenhagen
Rowers at the 1984 Summer Olympics
Olympic bronze medalists for Denmark
Olympic rowers of Denmark
Olympic medalists in rowing
Medalists at the 1984 Summer Olympics